The 2011–12 Robert Morris Colonials men's basketball team represented Robert Morris University during the 2011–12 NCAA Division I men's basketball season. The Colonials, led by second year head coach Andrew Toole, played their home games at the Charles L. Sewall Center and are members of the Northeast Conference. They finished the season 26–11, 13–5 in NEC play to finish in third place. They lost in the championship game of the NEC Basketball tournament to Long Island. They were invited to the 2012 CollegeInsider.com Tournament where they defeated Indiana State in the first round and Toledo in the second round before falling to Fairfield in the quarterfinals.

Roster

Schedule

|-
!colspan=9 style=| Exhibition

|-
!colspan=9 style=| Regular season

|-
!colspan=9 style=| NEC tournament

|-
!colspan=9 style=| CollegeInsider.com tournament

References

Robert Morris Colonials men's basketball seasons
Robert Morris
Robert Morris
Robert
Robert